Qualitative Social Work is a peer-reviewed academic journal that publishes papers six times a year in the field of social work. The journal's founding editors were Roy Ruckdeschel (Saint Louis University) and Ian Shaw (University of York). The current co-editors are Karen Staller (University of Michigan) and Lisa Morriss (Lancaster University). The journal has been in publication since 2002 and is currently published by SAGE Publications.

Scope 
Qualitative Social Work is primarily aimed at those interested in qualitative research and evaluation and in qualitative approaches to practice. The journal provides a forum for debate on the nature of reflective inquiry and practice, emerging applications of critical realism in social work, the potential of social constructionist and narrative approaches to research and practice.

Abstracting and indexing 
Qualitative Social Work is abstracted and indexed in the following databases:
 Academic Search Premier
 Academic Search Complete
 Criminal Justice Abstracts
 PsycINFO
 Public Affairs Index 
 Social Care Online
 Social Work Abstracts (Online)
 SocINDEX with Full Text
 SCOPUS
 ZETOC

External links

References
Publishers Description

SAGE Publishing academic journals
English-language journals
Social work
Qualitative research journals